The Rural Municipality of Hoodoo No. 401 is a rural municipality (RM) in the Canadian province of Saskatchewan within Census Division No. 15 and  Division No. 5.

History 
The RM of Hoodoo No. 401 incorporated as a rural municipality on January 1, 1913.

Geography

Communities and localities 
The following urban municipalities are surrounded by the RM.

Towns
 Wakaw
 Cudworth

Resort villages
 Wakaw Lake

The following unincorporated communities are within the RM.

Organized hamlets
 Balone Beach
 Cudsaskwa Beach

Localities
 Berard Beach
 Bonne Madone
 Domremy Beach
 Ens
 Leofnard
 Lepine
 Nelson Beach
 Nickorick Beach

Demographics 

Attractions 
 Wakaw Lake
 Wakaw Heritage Museum
 Wakaw Lake Regional Park
 Prud'homme Providence Museum
 Lucien Lake Regional Park
 Dana Provincial Recreation Site

Government 
The RM of Hoodoo No. 401 is governed by an elected municipal council and an appointed administrator that meets on the second Wednesday of every month. The reeve of the RM is Derreck Kolla while its administrator is Madsine Madsen. The RM's office is located in Cudworth.

Transportation 
 Saskatchewan Highway 2
 Saskatchewan Highway 41
 Saskatchewan Highway 777
 Cudworth Municipal Airport
 Cudworth Airport
 WRI Railway

See also 
List of rural municipalities in Saskatchewan

References 

H

Division No. 15, Saskatchewan